The "Nixon invert" was a reputed invert error of the Richard Nixon memorial postage stamp issued by the United States in 1995.  Originally reported in January 1996, it drew considerable attention that year; but in December a printing plant employee was arrested on charges of having stolen the misprinted stamps from the plant where he worked, meaning that instead of a legitimate error, they were worthless printer's waste.

The first public notice of the invert came in the form of an announcement by Christie's that they planned to auction a single copy of the invert on February 1, estimating its value at $8,000-$10,000.  Christie's did not supply the name of the consignor (a common practice), but did say that the stamp was one of 160.

The appearance of the stamp was that the portrait of Nixon was upside-down, and shifted so that it was split across. The "USA / 32" inscription was at the bottom and also inverted, leaving only the intaglio "Richard Nixon" inscription in its correct orientation and position.  This was possible because the stamp was actually printed in two steps.  First, the portrait and denomination combination was printed by Barton Press on a Heidelberg six-color sheet-fed offset press, then the stamps were sent to the Bank Note Corporation of America's (BCA) plant in Suffern, New York, where the intaglio inscription was applied using a Giori press.  BCA also perforated and finished the stamps.

The claim of 160 stamps and the lack of information on the discovery immediately generated both interest and skepticism.  To be a valid error, the stamps must have been sold to a postal customer; until that point, they are simply government property.  By comparison, the story of the Inverted Jenny discovery was known in minute detail and verified by multiple persons. In addition, it was unclear to philatelic experts how 160 were possible, given what they knew about size and handling of sheets of stamps.

Christie's auctioned off the one stamp to an unknown collector for $14,500, thus setting a market price.  Two days previously, dealer Dana Okey of San Diego had purchased 141 of the inverts from Christie's, and by April was selling them for $12,500, characterizing response as "awesome".

On December 12, Clarence Robert Robie, a former cutting machine operator at BCA's Suffern plant, was charged with theft of the 160 stamps.  He was also charged with having transported them to New York, and having sold 120 to a Brooklyn dealer for $60,000 in June, and the remaining 40 in August to a different dealer.  (Neither dealer was charged, apparently being unaware of the theft.)

It turned out that the nature of the misprint was such that of the original 200-stamp sheets (grouped into four 50-stamp panes), 10 stamps on the edge of each pane did not receive the intaglio inscription, and thus appeared as printing shifts, rather than as inverts.

Conviction
Robie had first contacted dealer Williams Langs in March 1995, then in a May meeting revealed the existence of the inverts, representing them as coming from a "woman in Virginia".  The deal struck in June was actually a trade (Robie being a collector himself), whereby Langs received 120 inverts in exchange for $60,000 worth of rare US stamps.  The 40 remaining stamps had been purchased by dealer Gary Posner with a combination of cash and stamps, who testified that Robie had told him that "a lady had purchased it in Virginia at a post office". Shortly thereafter Posner sold his 40 to Langs, who in November showed a single and block of four to Christie's.

Robie was convicted on both charges, May 22, 1997, after a trial lasting three days.

Subsequently, the United States Postal Inspection Service recovered all but one of the inverts.  This lone stamp may remain in private hands, but as it continues to be considered stolen property, the current owner cannot openly display or sell it to anyone else.

References 

 Michael Baadke, "Nixon invert found near Washington, D.C.; Christie's will auction single stamp Feb. 1", Linn's Stamp News, January 29, 1996
 Michael Baadke, "Printing plant employee stole Nixon inverts, U.S. attorney alleges; N.Y. resident arrested", Linn's Stamp News, December 30, 1996
 Michael Baadke, "Robie trial answers some questions, not all", Linn's Stamp News, June 16, 1997

1995 crimes in the United States
1995 works
Richard Nixon
Postage stamps of the United States
Postage stamp invert errors